The 2017–18 Tennessee State Tigers basketball team represented Tennessee State University during the 2017–18 NCAA Division I men's basketball season. The Tigers, led by fourth-year head coach Dana Ford, played their home games at the Gentry Complex in Nashville, Tennessee as members of the Ohio Valley Conference. They finished the season 15–15, 10–8 in OVC play to finish in a tie for fifth place. They lost in the first round of the OVC tournament to Eastern Illinois.

On March 21, 2018, head coach Dana Ford left Tennessee State for the head coaching job at Missouri State. He finished at Tennessee State with a four-year record of 57–65. On March 26, the school announced that former Illinois State assistant coach Brian Collins had been hired as head coach.

Previous season
The Tigers finished the 2016–17 season 17–13, 8–8 in OVC play to finish in a tie for fourth place in the East Division. As the No. 8 seed in the OVC tournament, they lost to Southeast Missouri State in the first round.

Preseason 
In a vote of conference coaches and sports information directors, Tennessee State was picked to finish in 7th place in the OVC.

After five years of divisional play in the OVC, the conference eliminated divisions for the 2017–18 season. Additionally, for the first time, each conference team will play 18 conference games.

Roster

Schedule and results

|-
!colspan=9 style=| Non-conference regular season

|-
!colspan=9 style=| Ohio Valley Conference regular season

|-
!colspan=9 style=|Ohio Valley Conference tournament

References

Tennessee State Tigers basketball seasons
Tennessee State
Tennessee State
Tennessee State